Mario Lopez (born 1973) is an American actor and television host.

Mario López may also refer to:

Mario López Estrada (born 1938), Guatemalan telecommunications businessman
Mario Lopez (jurist) (born 1955), Justice of the Supreme Court of the Philippines 
Mario López Valdez (born 1957), Mexican businessman and politician
Mario López (footballer) (born 1995), Paraguayan footballer

See also
Maria Lopez (disambiguation)